{{Infobox martial artist
|name            = Rick Roufus
|image           =
|birth_name      = Rick John Roufus
|other_names     = The Jet
|nationality     = 
|ethnicity       =
|height          = 5 ft 11 in
|weight          = 
|weight_class    = Light Middleweight Middleweight  Super Middleweight  Light Heavyweight  Cruiserweight  Heavyweight
|birth_date      =
|birth_place     = Milwaukee, Wisconsin, United States
|style           = Kickboxing, Taekwondo, Boxing 
|fighting_out_of = Phoenix, Arizona, United States
|team            = Roufus Kickboxing Center
|years_active = 1985 - 2012 (Kickboxing)  1990 - 2001 (Boxing)  2008 - 2009 (MMA)
| relatives       = Duke Roufus, brother
| kickbox_win     = 65
| kickbox_kowin   = 44
| kickbox_loss    = 9
| kickbox_draw    = 3
| kickbox_nc      = 1
| mma_kowin       = 2
| mma_subwin      = 
| mma_decwin      = 2
| mma_koloss      = 1
| mma_subloss     = 3
| mma_decloss     = 2
| box_win         = 13
| box_kowin       = 11
| box_loss        = 5
| sherdog         = 27343
| boxrec          = 7162|
| updated         = October 14, 2012
}}

Rick John Roufus (born June 3, 1966) is a retired American kickboxer. He is one of the most famous kickboxers in America, and has also competed professionally in boxing and mixed martial arts. An accomplished professional fighter throughout his competitive career, Roufus has won multiple world championships across the globe in several weight classes, he was world champion as a super middle weight, light heavyweight and heavyweight.
Roufus held titles for all the major kickboxing associations worldwide (PKA, IKF, ISKA, FFKA and KICK), and is known for his boxing skills and powerful kicks. He is the older brother of Duke Roufus who is also a kickboxer and a Muay Thai and mixed martial arts instructor. Rick Roufus is the Global Director of Fighter Development for PKA Worldwide. 

Biography and career
Rick Roufus began his lifelong practice of the martial arts at the age of 5. He learned taekwondo from his father. He quickly rose through the national point karate circuit and debuted as a professional kickboxer in his late teens. He had his first professional fight in May 1985 against J.C. Owens, whom he defeated by decision.

In April 1987, he fought against John Moncayo for the world title of KICK at super middleweight. Roufus knocked out Moncayo in round 7 to win his first world title.

In the beginning of his career, Roufus fought under the rule of Full contact where leg kicks, elbow strikes, and knee attacks were not allowed. He changed directions on 5 November 1988 when he challenged Changpuek Kiatsongrit in a non-title fight in Las Vegas. His kickboxing record stood at a perfect 28 wins, but  the Thai overcame a substantial weight difference by overwhelming Roufus with leg kicks. Roufus knocked Changpuek down twice with punches in the first round, but lost by knockout in the fifth round due to the culmination of low kicks that he was unprepared for. After the fight, the Roufus brothers sought out Thai experts to learn the art of delivering and checking leg kicks. 

On 19 June 1991, Rick Roufus faced Marek Piotrowski. It was a rematch, as Piotrowski defeated him in their first encounter. The vacant ISKA Full Contact Light World title was on the line, while Piotrowski's PKC Full Contact Light Heavyweight World title was also up for grabs. Roufus won by heavy second-round KO from a high kick that left the Polish fighter unconscious on the canvas.

On 20 December 1991, Roufus defended his ISKA Full Contact Light World Light Heavyweight title against Dutchman Rob Kaman. Roufus was initially declared the winner by decision, but the match was later declared a no-contest after Kaman's corner protested that only 1 minute had been fought in the 4th round - a round that could have been critical to Kaman as he had hurt his opponent. A second bout between the pair came to fruition in February 1994 in Paris, France. The fight was sold out - 20,000 people - weeks in advance. Roufus won the rematch by KO in the second round.

On January 22, 1994 Roufus won the IKF Pro Full Contact Rules Light Heavyweight World Title when he defeated Michael McDonald of Vancouver, BC, Canada, by "KO" at :43 seconds of round 1 at Caesars Tahoe Casino in Lake Tahoe, Nevada.

On 26 March 1994 he travelled to Montreal, Quebec, Canada, where he took on Jean-Yves Thériault. Roufus won by unanimous decision after 12 rounds, defending his PKC Full Contact Light Heavyweight World title. In Paris in 1994, he met Ernesto Hoost, the WMTA and WKA World Light Heavyweight champion. Roufus lost by KO.

He later decided to enter the world of boxing. He enjoyed some success, but he was never able to fight for a world championship. In August 1996, he challenged for the vacant WBC Continental Americas cruiserweight title. He knocked out Sean McClain, and won his first and only title in boxing. After several losses Rick Roufus returned to kickboxing.
He emerged victorious at the K-1 USA held August 17, 1998 in Las Vegas, quickly dispatching Pedro Fernandez and Jerome Turcan.

On May 15, 1999 in Lowell Massachusetts, he won the IKF Pro International Rules Heavyweight World title when he defeated Stan Longinidis of Box Hill, Victoria, Australia by RSC after Loniginidis suffered a broken bone in his foot at the end of round 9.it was also later known Longinidis had been ill weeks leading to the fight. Roufus was ahead on all three judges cards at the time, 89-81, 86-83 and 88-81.

In his MMA debut, Roufus lost to Maurice Smith in the first round via kimura at the Strikeforce: At The Dome event in Tacoma, Washington on February 23, 2008.

In March 2008, Roufus had his second MMA bout, this time in Newkirk, Oklahoma for Caged Combat Championship Fights. With his first wrestling training partner in MMA working his corner Daniel K Finch from Yukon Oklahoma, He defeated Mike Buell via unanimous decision. After a stint in several local promotions, Roufus brought his mixed martial arts record to 4 wins with 6 losses.

Titles
Kickboxing
2003 K-1 World Grand Prix 2002 Preliminary USA runner up
2002 K-1 World Grand Prix 2002 Preliminary USA runner up
1999 IKF International Rules Heavyweight World Champion 
1998 K-1 USA Grand Prix '98 champion
1996 ISKA Full Contact Heavyweight World champion 
1994 IKF Full Contact Light Heavyweight World Champion 
1991-94 PKC Light Heavyweight World champion 
1991-94 ISKA Full Contact Light Heavyweight World champion 
1990 FFKA Light Heavyweight World champion 
1989 FFKA Super Middleweight World champion 
1987 KICK Super Middleweight World champion 
1986-89 PKC Middleweight U.S champion 
1986 PKC Light Middleweight U.S champion
Boxing
1996 WBC Continental Americas Cruiserweight champion

Kickboxing record

|- style="background:#c5d2ea;"
| 2012-10-14 || Draw ||align=left| James Wilson || K-1 World Grand Prix 2012 in Tokyo Final 16 || Tokyo, Japan || Decision draw || 3 || 3:00 || 65-9-3 
|- style="background:#cfc;"
| 2012-09-08 || Win ||align=left| Mighty Mo || K-1 World Grand Prix || Los Angeles, USA || Decision (Split) || 3 || 3:00 ||
|- style="background:#cfc;"
| 2011-11-22 || Win ||align=left| Anthony Newman || WCK Muay Thai: USA vs. China || Las Vegas, Nevada, USA || KO (spinning back fist) ||  || ||
|- style="background:#cfc;"
| 2007-05-00 || Win ||align=left|  John James  || Shin Do Kumaté  || St. Petersburg, Florida, USA || KO (Left High Kick) || 1 ||  ||
|- style="background:#c5d2ea;"
| 2006-09-09 || Draw ||align=left| Gary Turner || Shin Do Kumaté X || St. Petersburg, Florida, USA || Decision draw || 4 || 3:00 ||
|- style="background:#cfc;"
| 2006-03-05 || Win ||align=left| Mehrdad Khan Moayedi || Shin Do Kumaté IX  || St. Petersburg, Florida, USA || TKO (kick to the body) || 3 || ||
|- style="background:#fbb;"
| 2005-04-30 || Loss ||align=left| Musashi || K-1 World Grand Prix 2005 in Las Vegas || Las Vegas, Nevada, USA || Decision (Majority) || 3 || 3:00 ||
|- style="background:#cfc;"
| 2004-08-07 || Win ||align=left| Akebono || K-1 World Grand Prix 2004 in Las Vegas II || Las Vegas, Nevada, USA || Decision (Unanimous) || 3 || 3:00 ||
|- style="background:#cfc;"
| 2003-08-15 || Win ||align=left| Jeff Ford || K-1 World Grand Prix 2003 in Las Vegas II || Las Vegas, Nevada, USA || Decision (Unanimous) || 3 || 3:00 || 59-7-1
|- style="background:#fbb;"
| 2003-05-02 || Loss ||align=left| Carter Williams || K-1 World Grand Prix 2003 in Las Vegas Final || Las Vegas, Nevada, USA || TKO (Referee Stoppage) || 1 || 2:24 ||
|-
|style=background:white colspan=9 |
|- style="background:#cfc;"
| 2003-05-02 || Win ||align=left| Maurice Smith || K-1 World Grand Prix 2003 in Las Vegas Semi-final || Las Vegas, Nevada, USA || Decision (Unanimous) || 3 || 3:00 ||
|- style="background:#cfc;"
| 2003-05-02 || Win ||align=left| Eduardo Maiorino || K-1 World Grand Prix 2003 in Las Vegas Quarter-final || Las Vegas, Nevada, USA || TKO (2 Knockdowns) || 1 || 2:54 ||
|- style="background:#fbb;"
| 2002-05-03 || Loss ||align=left| Michael McDonald || K-1 World Grand Prix 2002 Preliminary USA Final || Las Vegas, Nevada, USA || TKO (Corner Stoppage) || 4 || 3:00 ||
|-
| style=background:white colspan=9 |
|- style="background:#cfc;"
| 2002-05-03 || Win ||align=left| Dewey Cooper || K-1 World Grand Prix 2002 Preliminary USA Semi-final || Las Vegas, Nevada, USA || Decision (Unanimous) || 3 || 3:00 ||
|- style="background:#cfc;"
| 2002-05-03 || Win ||align=left| Kurt Hasley || K-1 World Grand Prix 2002 Preliminary USA Quarter-final || Las Vegas, Nevada, USA || Decision (Unanimous) || 3 || 3:00 ||
|- style="background:#fbb;"
| 2000-03-18 || Loss ||align=left| Cyrille Diabate || I.S.K.A. Championship || Las Vegas, Nevada, USA || TKO (Doctor Stoppage) || 3 || 3:00 ||
|- style="background:#cfc;"
| 1999-05-15 || Win ||align=left| Stan Longinidis || MASS Destruction || Lowell, Massachusetts, USA || TKO (Retirement) || 9 || 3:00 ||
|-
| style=background:white colspan=9 |
|- style="background:#fbb;"
| 1998-09-27 || Loss ||align=left| Francisco Filho || K-1 World Grand Prix '98 Opening Round || Osaka, Japan || KO (Right Low Kick) || 3 || 0:15 ||
|-
! style=background:white colspan=9 |
|- style="background:#cfc;"
| 1998-08-07 || Win ||align=left| Curtis Schuster || K-1 USA Grand Prix '98 Final || Las Vegas, Nevada, USA || Gave Up (Unable to fight) || N/A || N/A ||
|-
| style=background:white colspan=9 |
|- style="background:#cfc;"
| 1998-08-07 || Win ||align=left| Jerome Turcan || K-1 USA Grand Prix '98 Semi-final || Las Vegas, Nevada, USA || KO (Right Hook) || 2 || 0:58 ||
|- style="background:#cfc;"
| 1998-08-07 || Win ||align=left| Pedro Fernandez || K-1 USA Grand Prix '98 Quarter-final || Las Vegas, Nevada, United States || KO (Left Hook) || 2 || 1:50 ||
|- style="background:#fbb;"
| 1997-09-07 || Loss ||align=left| Jérôme Le Banner || K-1 Grand Prix '97 1st Round || Osaka, Osaka, Japan || TKO (Referee Stoppage) || 3 || 2:05 ||
|-
| style=background:white colspan=9 |
|- style="background:#cfc;"
| 1996-06-01 || Win ||align=left| Igor Sharapov ||  || Paris, France || TKO (Doctor Stoppage) || 4 || 2:00 ||
|-
| style=background:white colspan=9 |
|- style="background:#cfc;"
| 1995-03-25 || Win ||align=left| Martin van Emmen || || || || || ||
|- style="background:#cfc;"
| 1995-03-13 || Win ||align=left| Lavelle Robinson || I.S.K.A. Kickboxing || Santa Cruz, California, USA || KO (Left High Kick) || 3 || 0:30 ||
|- style="background:#fbb;"
| 1994-11-12 || Loss ||align=left| Ernesto Hoost || Thriller in Marseille || Marseille, France || KO (Right High kick) || 11 || 1:02 ||
|-
| style=background:white colspan=9 |
|- style="background:#f7f6a8;"
| 1994 || Exhibition ||align=left| Dominique Valera ||  || Paris, France || Exhibition  ||  || ||
|- style="background:#cfc;"
| 1994-03-26 || Win ||align=left| Jean-Yves Thériault || Karatemania VIII || Montreal, Quebec, Canada || Decision (Unanimous) || 12 || 2:00 || 45-2
|-
| style=background:white colspan=9 |
|- style="background:#cfc;"
| 1994-02-05 || Win ||align=left| Rob Kaman ||  || Paris, France || KO (Left Hook) || 2 || ||
|-
| style=background:white colspan=9 |
|- style="background:#cfc;"
| 1994-01-22 || Win ||align=left| Michael McDonald || International Kickboxing Federation - Karatemania || Tahoe, Nevada, USA || KO || 1 || 0:43 ||
|-
! style=background:white colspan=9 |
|- style="background:#cfc;"
| 1993-05-07 || Win ||align=left| Józef Warchoł ||  || France || TKO (Corner quit after round) || 3 ||  ||
|- style="background:#cfc;"
| 1993-03-26 || Win ||align=left| Luc Verheye ||  || Paris, France || KO (Punches) || 4 || ||
|-  style="text-align:center; background:#cfc;"
| 1992-12-15 || Win ||align=left| Jersey Long || Karatemania V  || Montreal, Quebec, Canada || TKO ||  || || 39-2
|-
! style=background:white colspan=9 |
|-  style="text-align:center; background:#cfc;"
| 1992-11-13 || Win ||align=left| Ernesto Hoost ||  || Marseille, France || Decision (Unanimous) || 12 || 2:00 || 38-2
|-
! style=background:white colspan=9 |
|-  style="text-align:center; background:#cfc;"
| 1992-04-25 || Win ||align=left| Henk Pelser || Karatemania IV || Atlanta, Georgia, USA || KO || 8 || || 37-2
|-  style="text-align:center; background:#c5d2ea;"
| 1991-12-20 || No Contest ||align=left| Rob Kaman || Les Choc Des Geants || Paris, France || No Contest || 12 || 2:00 ||
|-
! style=background:white colspan=9 |
|-  style="text-align:center; background:#cfc;"
| 1991-08-24 || Win ||align=left| William Knorr || Karatemania III || USA || Disqualification || 4 || || 36-2
|-
! style=background:white colspan=9 |
|-  style="text-align:center; background:#cfc;"
| 1991-06-22 || Win ||align=left| Marek Piotrowski ||  || Chicago, Illinois, USA || KO (High Kick) || 2 || 0:59 || 35-2
|-
! style=background:white colspan=9 |
|-  style="text-align:center; background:#cfc;"
| 1990-02-04 || Win ||align=left| Kevin Whaley ||  || Lancaster, Pennsylvania, USA || Decision (Unanimous) || 10 || 2:00 || 33-2
|-
! style=background:white colspan=9 |
|-  style="text-align:center; background:#cfc;"
| 1990 || Win ||align=left| Bob Thurman ||  ||  USA || KO (Left Hook) || 2 ||  || 
|-
|-  style="text-align:center; background:#fbb;"
| 1989-08-19 || Loss ||align=left| Marek Piotrowski ||  || Chicago, Illinois, USA || Decision (Unanimous) || 10 || 2:00 || 31-2
|-
! style=background:white colspan=9 |
|-  style="text-align:center; background:#cfc;"
| 1989-07-20 || Win ||align=left| Andy Mayo ||  || Milwaukee, Wisconsin, USA || KO || 3 || || 31-1
|-
! style=background:white colspan=9 |
|-  style="text-align:center; background:#cfc;"
| 1989-00-00 || Win ||align=left| Michel Mangeot ||  || || ||  || || 
|-  style="text-align:center; background:#cfc;"
| 1989-04-01 || Win ||align=left| Manson Gibson ||  || USA || Decision ||  || ||
|-  style="text-align:center; background:#fbb;"
| 1988-11-05 || Loss ||align=left| Changpuek Kiatsongrit || Super Fight Kickboxing || Las Vegas, Nevada, USA || TKO (Left Low Kicks) || 5 || 1:23 || 28-1
|-  style="text-align:center; background:#cfc;"
| 1988-00-00 || Win ||align=left| Mike Steele ||  || USA || KO (Left Hook) || 1 || 1:15 || 25-0
|-  style="text-align:center; background:#cfc;"
| 1988-00-00 || Win ||align=left| Chris Getz ||  || USA || KO (Left Hook) || 1 || || 24-0
|-  style="text-align:center; background:#cfc;"

| 1988-01-28 || Win ||align=left| William Knorr ||  || Milwaukee, Wisconsin, USA || TKO (Left Round Kick) || 3 || || 
|-
! style=background:white colspan=9 |
|-  style="text-align:center; background:#cfc;"
| 1987-00-00 || Win ||align=left| Manson Gibson ||  || USA || Decision ||  || ||
|-  style="text-align:center; background:#cfc;"
| 1987-04-16 || Win ||align=left| John Moncayo || Karatemania II || Atlanta, Georgia, USA || KO || 7 || 1:04 || 17-0
|-
! style=background:white colspan=9 |
|-  style="text-align:center; background:#cfc;"
| 1987-03-13 || Win ||align=left| Jordan Keepers ||  || USA ||  ||  || || 16-0

|-  style="text-align:center; background:#cfc;"
| 1986-11-20 || Win ||align=left| Rich Lopez || Nautilus American Kickboxing Championships || Lake Helen, Florida, USA || Decision (Unanimous) || 9 || 2:00 || 15-0
|-
! style=background:white colspan=9 |
|-  style="text-align:center; background:#cfc;"
| 1986-09-10 || Win ||align=left| Oliver Miller ||  || Atlanta, Georgia, USA || Decision (Unanimous)|| 9 || 2:00 ||
|-
! style=background:white colspan=9 |
|-  style="text-align:center; background:#cfc;"
| 1986-05-21 || Win ||align=left| Larry McFadden ||   || USA ||  ||  || || 
|-  style="text-align:center; background:#cfc;"
| 1986-04-26 || Win ||align=left| Tony Smith ||  Karatemania I || Atlanta, Georgia, USA || KO (Left High Kick || 2 || || 12-0
|-
! style=background:white colspan=9 |
|-  style="text-align:center; background:#cfc;"
| 1986-01-08 || Win ||align=left| Sylvester Cash ||  || Atlanta, Georgia, USA || Decision (Unanimous)|| 9 || 2:00 ||
|-
! style=background:white colspan=9 |
|- style="background:#cfc;"
| 1985-11-02 || Win ||align=left| Gerald Murphy || Kenwood U.S. Open National Karate Championships || Daytona Beach, Florida, USA || KO (Punch) || 1 || ||
|- style="background:#cfc;"
| 1985-08-16 || Win ||align=left| Wade Woodbury ||  || Toledo, Florida, USA || Decision (Split) || 12 || || 6-0
|- style="background:#cfc;"
| 1985-00-00 || Win ||align=left| J.C Owens ||  || USA ||  ||  || ||
|- style="background:#cfc;"
| 1985-00-00 || Win ||align=left| Mike Winklejohn ||  ||  USA || Decision (Unanimous) ||  || ||
|-
| colspan=9 | Legend'':

Mixed martial arts record 

|-
|Loss
|align=center|4–6
|Wayne Cole
|Submission (armbar)
|SJW 3 - Slammin Jammin Weekend 3
|
|align=center|1
|align=center|0:36
|
|
|-
|Loss
|align=center|4–5
|Ryan Jimmo
|TKO (punches)
|PFP: Wanted
|
|align=center|1
|align=center|2:24
|Dartmouth, Nova Scotia, Canada
|
|-
|Loss
|align=center|4–4
|Hector Ramirez
|Decision (unanimous)
|SuperFights MMA - Night of Combat 2
|
|align=center|3
|align=center|5:00
|Las Vegas, Nevada, USA
|
|-
|Win
|align=center|4–3
|Reggie Cato
|TKO (corner stoppage)
|C3 Fights - Clash in Concho
|
|align=center|2
|
|Concho, Oklahoma, USA
|
|-
|Loss
|align=center|3–3
|Todd Brown
|Submission (triangle choke)
|Combat USA - Fight Night
|
|align=center|2
|align=center|1:31
|Harris, Michigan, USA
|
|-
|Win
|align=center|3–2
|Roberto Martinez
|Decision (unanimous)
|C3 Fights - Contenders
|
|align=center|3
|
|Concho, Oklahoma, USA
|
|-
|Win
|align=center|2–2
|B.J. Lacy
|KO (punches)
|Combat USA - Battle in the Bay 7
|
|align=center|3
|
|Green Bay, Wisconsin, USA
|
|-
|Loss
|align=center|1–2
|Michael McDonald
|Decision (unanimous)
|Strike FC: Night of Gladiators
|
|align=center|2
|align=center|5:00
|Ploiești, Romania
|
|-
|Win
|align=center|1–1
|Michael Buell
|Decision (unanimous)
|CCCF - Battle on the Border
|
|align=center|3
|align=center|3:00
|Newkirk, Oklahoma, USA
|
|-
|Loss
|align=center|0–1
|Maurice Smith
|Submission (straight armbar)
|Strikeforce: At The Dome
|
|align=center|1
|align=center|1:53
|Tacoma, Washington, USA
|
|-

Professional boxing record

|-
| style="text-align:center;" colspan="8"|13 Wins (11 knockouts, 2 decisions), 5 Losses (3 knockouts, 2 decisions), 1 Draw
|-  style="text-align:center; background:#e3e3e3;"
|  style="border-style:none none solid solid; "|Result
|  style="border-style:none none solid solid; "|Record
|  style="border-style:none none solid solid; "|Opponent
|  style="border-style:none none solid solid; "|Type
|  style="border-style:none none solid solid; "|Round
|  style="border-style:none none solid solid; "|Date
|  style="border-style:none none solid solid; "|Location
|  style="border-style:none none solid solid; "|Notes
|- align=center
|Loss
|align=left|
|align=left| Dale Brown
|TKO
|9
|30/11/2001
|align=left| Montreal, Quebec, Canada
|align=left|
|-
|Win
|
|align=left| James Johnson
|UD
|4
|23/02/2001
|align=left| Janesville, Wisconsin, United States
|align=left|
|-
|Loss
|
|align=left| Ismael Youla
|PTS
|8
|21/02/1998
|align=left| Paris, France
|align=left|
|-
|Loss
|
|align=left| Arthur Williams
|TKO
|4
|22/02/1997
|align=left| Condado, Puerto Rico, United States
|align=left|
|-
|Loss
|
|align=left| Bobby Crabtree
|TKO
|7
|27/09/1996
|align=left| Atlantic City, New Jersey, United States
|align=left|
|-
|Win
|
|align=left| Sean McClain
|TKO
|4
|10/08/1996
|align=left| Las Vegas, Nevada, United States
|align=left|
|-
|Win
|
|align=left| Carlton Brown
|KO
|2
|27/04/1996
|align=left| Doraville, Georgia, United States
|align=left|
|-
|Win
|
|align=left| Rogue Dooley
|TKO
|1
|26/04/1996
|align=left| Harvey, Illinois, United States
|align=left|
|-
|Win
|
|align=left| Stan Johnson
|TKO
|1
|16/04/1996
|align=left| Indianapolis, Indiana, United States
|align=left|
|-
|Win
|
|align=left| Rick Wilks
|KO
|1
|30/03/1996
|align=left| Waterloo, Iowa, United States
|align=left|
|-
|Win
|
|align=left| Raymond Wilks
|KO
|1
|29/03/1996
|align=left| Dolton, Illinois, United States
|align=left|
|-
|  style="text-align:center; background:#c5d2ea;"|Draw
|
|align=left| Louis Monaco
|PTS
|4
|26/01/1996
|align=left| Las Vegas, Nevada, United States
|align=left|
|-
|Win
|
|align=left| Gene Ibarra
|TKO
|2
|04/11/1995
|align=left| Las Vegas, Nevada, United States
|align=left|
|-
|Win
|
|align=left| Daniel Salcedo
|TKO
|2
|30/09/1995
|align=left| Las Vegas, Nevada, United States
|align=left|
|-
|Win
|
|align=left| Jordan Keepers
|KO
|2
|16/09/1995
|align=left| Milwaukee, Wisconsin, United States
|align=left|
|-
|Win
|
|align=left| Ron Preston
|UD
|4
|18/08/1995
|align=left| Las Vegas, Nevada, United States
|align=left|
|-
|Win
|
|align=left| Dennis Weaver
|TKO
|2
|03/08/1995
|align=left| Las Vegas, Nevada, United States
|align=left|
|-
|Win
|
|align=left| Mike Brainard
|TKO
|3
|17/06/1995
|align=left| Las Vegas, Nevada, United States
|align=left|
|-
|Loss
|
|align=left| Ricardo Dabney
|PTS
|4
|29/04/1990
|align=left| Atlantic City, New Jersey, United States
|align=left|
|}

References

External links

Profile at K-1
Rick Roufus on Myspace

1967 births
Living people
Sportspeople from Milwaukee
American male kickboxers
Kickboxers from Wisconsin
Middleweight kickboxers
Light heavyweight kickboxers
Heavyweight kickboxers
Boxers from Wisconsin
Heavyweight boxers
American male mixed martial artists
Mixed martial artists from Wisconsin
Light heavyweight mixed martial artists
Mixed martial artists utilizing taekwondo
Mixed martial artists utilizing karate
Mixed martial artists utilizing kickboxing
Mixed martial artists utilizing boxing
American male karateka
American male boxers
American male taekwondo practitioners